Bad Boy Billionaires: India also known as Bad Boy Billionaires is a 2020 Indian Netflix original documentary anthology webseries which focuses on the lives of four prominent business magnates of India, including Vijay Mallya, Nirav Modi, Subrata Roy and Ramalinga Raju, who achieved predominant success in their businesses during their lifetime before being accused of corruption. The documentary chronicles major financial scams in India and was released in part, following a lawsuit initiated by Subrata Roy's Sahara Group. Netflix unveiled the official trailer of the film on 24 August 2020 and it was reported that the trailer was removed subsequently from the platform following legal issues. The documentary was initially scheduled to be streamed via Netflix on 2 September 2020.

Three (out of four) episodes of Bad Boy Billionaires released globally on Netflix in October 2020 to enthusiastic reviews and strong viewership. It went on to enjoy a multiple-week run as the number one most-watched Netflix title in India while also nearing the top of Netflix's global charts and being named the most-watched documentary of the year 2020 in India. It won the Filmfare Award, India's top film honour, in 2021.

Plot 
The documentary series explores scandals involving controversial Indian billionaires Vijay Mallya (Kingfisher Airlines), Subrata Roy (Sahara India), Nirav Modi (Gitanjali Group) and Ramalinga Raju (Satyam Computers).

Episodes

Legal issues 
On 28 August 2020, two petitions were filed against the release of the documentary in the Bihar district court. Bihar court passed an interim stay order on the petition filed by Subrata Roy against the release of the documentary in the Netflix platform. Following the stay order by the Bihar court, Netflix threatened to move to the Supreme Court against the court order for restraining the documentary release.

Diamond merchant Mehul Choksi also filed a petition against the release of the documentary in the Delhi High Court and further filed a request demanding for the pre-screening of the documentary. Mehul Choksi filed the plea after being told that his involvement related to the Punjab National Bank Scam was also covered in the documentary. However his plea was dismissed by a single judge panel of the Delhi High Court on 29 August 2020.

On 1 September 2020, Hyderabad civil court restrained the release of the webseries after issuing a stay order on a petition filed by Ramalinga Raju. Raju claimed that the webseries documents half-truths about him and insisted that it would tarnish his reputation and privacy in an unlawful way.

On 2 September 2020, the Supreme Court rejected the plea for relief filed by Netflix and upheld the stay order on the release of the documentary.

On 5 October 2020, Netflix released three out of four films in the anthology, including those featuring Vijay Mallya, Nirav Modi and Subrata Roy, while the final episode about Ramalinga Raju remained encumbered by legal injunctions and as of December 2020 has yet to be released.

Awards and nominations

WINNER— Best Nonfiction Original, Series/Special — 2021 Filmfare OTT Awards, December 2021

References

External links 

 
 

Netflix original documentary television series